

Tallest structures in Kosovo

References 

Kosovo
Kosovo
Tallest